Norm Higgins (born 18 November 1936) is a former American male marathon runner, who won an edition of the New York City Marathon (1971).

He also won a national championship at individual senior level (1966 in marathon).

References

External links
 Norm Higgins at Association of Road Racing Statisticians

1936 births
Living people
American male marathon runners
Place of birth missing (living people)